Portuguese Championship (Portuguese: Campeonato Português) may refer to:

Campeonato Português de Rugby
Portuguese Chess Championship
Portuguese District Championships
Portuguese Indoor Men's Athletics Championship 
Portuguese Indoor Women's Athletics Championship
Portuguese National Badminton Championships
Portuguese Outdoor Men's Athletics Championship
Portuguese Outdoor Women's Athletics Championship